The gender gaps in mathematics and reading achievement refer to the finding that, on average, the two sexes perform differently in mathematics and reading skills on tests. On average, boys and men exceed in mathematics, while girls and women exceed in reading skills.

Mathematics and reading gaps by country

The Programme for International Student Assessment assesses the performance of 15-year-olds in mathematics and reading in OECD and OECD partner countries. The table below lists the scores of the PISA 2009 assessment in mathematics and reading by country, as well as the difference between boys and girls. Gaps in bold font mean that the gender gap is statistically significant (p<0.05). A positive mathematics gap means that boys outperform girls, a negative mathematics gap means that girls outperform boys. A positive reading gap means that girls outperform boys (no country has a negative reading gap). There is a negative correlation between the mathematics and reading gender gaps, that is, nations with a larger mathematics gap have a smaller reading gap and vice versa.

References 

Gender equality
Gender and education